Tygarts Creek is a tributary of the Ohio River in Carter and Greenup counties of northeastern Kentucky in the United States. Via the Ohio, it is part of the watershed of the Mississippi River. Tygarts Creek is named for early Kentucky explorer Michael Tygart, who eventually drowned in the creek, somewhere near the mouth.

Tygarts Creek is formed in southwestern Carter County by the confluence of minor tributaries, Upper Tygart Branch and Flat Fork. It is joined a few miles down stream by the larger tributary known as Soldier Fork. Tygarts Creek flows generally north-northeastwardly past Olive Hill and Carter Caves State Park into Greenup County, where it flows into the Ohio River at the city of South Shore.

See also
List of Kentucky rivers

References

 Kentucky Geological Survey

Rivers of Kentucky
Tributaries of the Ohio River
Rivers of Carter County, Kentucky
Rivers of Greenup County, Kentucky